Pavel Panteleyevich (in some sources Panteleymonovich) Gusev (born 2 January 1953) is a Russian professional football coach and a former player.

Playing career
He played four games in the 1981–82 European Cup Winners' Cup for FC SKA Rostov-on-Don after winning the Soviet Cup with the team in 1981.

Managerial career
Until 1 August 2013, he worked as a manager with FC Ural Sverdlovsk Oblast and in 2013 promoted them to the Russian Football Premier League for the first time since 1996.

References

External links
 

1953 births
Living people
Sportspeople from Rostov-on-Don
Soviet footballers
FC Rotor Volgograd players
FC SKA Rostov-on-Don players
Soviet football managers
Russian football managers
FC Rotor Volgograd managers
FC Fakel Voronezh managers
FC Ural Yekaterinburg managers
Russian Premier League managers
FC SKA Rostov-on-Don managers
FC Taganrog players
FC Dynamo Saint Petersburg managers
Association football midfielders